Raffaella Brutto (born 10 January 1988 in Genoa) is an Italian snowboarder, specializing in snowboard cross.

Brutto competed at the 2010 and 2014 Winter Olympics for Italy. In 2010, she was 17th in the qualification round of the snowboard cross, not advancing. In the 2014 snowboard cross, she was 19th in the seeding round, and then 4th in her quarterfinal, not advancing and ending 16th overall.

As of September 2014, her best showing at the World Championships is 6th, in 2013.

Brutto made her World Cup debut in January 2006. As of September 2014, she has two World Cup podium finishes, with her best a silver at Montafon in 2012–13. Her best overall finish is 7th, in 2012–13.

World Cup Podiums

References

1988 births
Living people
Olympic snowboarders of Italy
Snowboarders at the 2010 Winter Olympics
Snowboarders at the 2014 Winter Olympics
Snowboarders at the 2018 Winter Olympics
Sportspeople from Genoa
Italian female snowboarders
Universiade medalists in snowboarding
Universiade bronze medalists for Italy
Competitors at the 2007 Winter Universiade
Competitors at the 2009 Winter Universiade
21st-century Italian women